Athletics competitions at the 1999 South Pacific Games were held in Santa Rita, Guam, between June 3–11, 1999.

A total of 45 events were contested, 23 by men and 22 by women.

Medal summary
Medal winners and their results were published on the Athletics Weekly webpage
courtesy of Tony Isaacs and Børre Lilloe, and on the Oceania Athletics Association webpage by Bob Snow.

Complete results can also be found on the Oceania Athletics Association. and on the Athletics PNG webpages, both also compiled by Bob Snow.

Men

Women

Medal table (unofficial)
The medal table was published.

Participation (unofficial)
Athletes from the following 19 countries were reported to participate:

 
 
 
 
 
 
 
 
 
 
 
 
 
 
 
/ 
 
 
/

References

External links
Pacific Games Council
Oceania Athletics Association

Athletics at the Pacific Games
Athletics in Guam
South Pacific Games
1999 in Guamanian sports
1999 Pacific Games